Joan Moore (born August 14, 1954) is an American gymnast. She competed in six events at the 1972 Summer Olympics.

Competitive history

References

External links
 

1954 births
Living people
American female artistic gymnasts
Olympic gymnasts of the United States
Gymnasts at the 1972 Summer Olympics
Gymnasts from Philadelphia
21st-century American women